Little Iodine is an American Sunday comic strip, created by Jimmy Hatlo, which was syndicated by King Features and ran from August 15, 1943 until August 14, 1983. The strip was a spin-off of They'll Do It Every Time, an earlier Hatlo creation.

Publication history 
From August 14, 1943 to February 13, 1966, Little Iodine was written and drawn by Hatlo, who said, "I tried to make her the embodiment of all the brats I knew... I tried to make her naughty as hell—and still likable."

Al Scaduto also contributed to the strip from February 20, 1966 to September 3, 1967, with Hy Eisman and Bob Dunn taking the strip from September 10, 1967 through its end in August 1983. Iodine also appeared in a series of 56 Dell Comics between 1949 and 1962.

Iodine made a cameo appearance on the October 30th 2022 strip of the Popeye Sunday strips.

Characters and story
First seen during the 1930s in a supporting role in Hatlo's popular gag panel, They'll Do It Every Time, Little Iodine was the daughter of Henry Tremblechin and his wife, Cora. Her purpose was to serve as a pesky nuisance to the strip's star, Henry, and her behavior caused endless misery for her mild-mannered, easily unsettled father.

However, Iodine proved to be popular in her own right, stealing the strip from her parents, so Hatlo promoted the character into her own strip in 1943. Iodine's antics gave the Sunday comics page a female precursor to Hank Ketcham's Dennis the Menace.

Film adaptation

In 1946, Comet Productions, a company established by Mary Pickford, her husband, Charles Rogers and Columbia executive Ralph Cohn, produced a 56-minute feature film, Little Iodine, starring Hobart Cavanaugh as Henry, Irene Ryan as Cora and Jo Ann Marlowe as Little Iodine. The film was directed by Reginald Le Borg.

In the movie, Iodine thinks that her mother is having an affair with Professor Simkins (Leon Belasco). Consequently, she tries one antic after another to break up the adulterous couple. Her efforts backfire when they cause conflict between Henry and his employer, Mr. Bigdome (Emory Parnell). 

The film was scheduled for release earlier than October 20, 1946 (its actual distribution date), but that date was postponed due to an epidemic of polio that prevented children across the United States from attending films. The film is considered a lost film.

References

Sources
 Strickler, Dave. Syndicated Comic Strips and Artists, 1924-1995: The Complete Index. Cambria, California: Comics Access, 1995.

External links 
Little Iodine [character] at Don Markstein's Toonopedia. Archived from the original on November 10, 2015.
Hal Erickson reviews Little Iodine film

1943 comics debuts
1983 comics endings
American comics adapted into films
American comics characters
American comic strips
Child characters in comics
Comics adapted into animated series
Comics spin-offs
Comics about women
Female characters in comics
Gag-a-day comics